The epithet the Steadfast may refer to:

John, Elector of Saxony (1468-1532)
Selim I (1465/1466/1470-1520), Sultan of the Ottoman Empire
Húrin, a fictional character in J. R. R. Tolkien's Middle-earth

Lists of people by epithet